Namak Ruy (also Romanized as Namak Rūy) is a village in Poshtkuh-e Rostam Rural District, Sorna District, Rostam County, Fars Province, Iran. At the 2006 census, its population was 27, in 7 families.

References 

Populated places in Rostam County